Sir Stafford Fairborne was an English landowner and soldier of the seventeenth century.

Born in Newark, he served as a colonel in the Royalist Army of Charles I during the English Civil War. He was the father of the army officer and Governor of Tangier Sir Palmes Fairborne, and the grandfather of the Admiral Stafford Fairborne, who was named after him.

References

Bibliography

 Cornelius Brown. History of Newark-on-Trent: Volume II. Whiles, 1907.

17th-century English soldiers
People from Newark-on-Trent
English soldiers
Royalist military personnel of the English Civil War
Cavaliers
Knights Bachelor
Year of death unknown
Year of birth unknown
Military personnel from Nottinghamshire